The Nile Expedition, sometimes called the Gordon Relief Expedition (1884–85), was a British mission to relieve Major-General Charles George Gordon at Khartoum, Sudan.  Gordon had been sent to the Sudan to help Egyptians evacuate from Sudan after Britain decided to abandon the country in the face of a rebellion led by self-proclaimed Mahdi, Mahommed Ahmed.  A contingent of Canadians was recruited to help the British navigate their small boats up the Nile River.  The Nile Expedition was the first overseas expedition by Canadians in a British imperial conflict, although the Nile Voyageurs were civilian employees and did not wear uniforms.

The expedition was commanded by Garnet Wolseley. After Commander Herbert Stewart was mortally wounded, Brigadier-General Charles William Wilson took command of an advance party of about 1,400 men. On two Nile steamers Wilson's Desert Column reached Khartoum in the afternoon of 28 January 1885. It came two days too late: Khartoum had been seized by the Mahdists in the early hours of 26 January.  Between 5,000 and 10,000 inhabitants of the city were slaughtered, among them Gordon.

Wilson received criticism afterwards for his delay in sailing to Khartoum, with Wolseley stating that Wilson had "lost any nerve he had ever possessed". Other sources however, spread the blame, particularly on Wolseley. The public in England also blamed Prime Minister William Gladstone for not having taken steps to relieve the siege of Khartoum and some historians have held Major-General Gordon responsible, because he had refused the order to evacuate while that was still possible.

Background
Not wanting to be involved in the costly suppression of the rebellion led by Mahommed Ahmed, the  United Kingdom of Great Britain and Ireland ordered Egypt to abandon its administration of the Sudan in December 1883. The British government asked General Gordon, former Governor-General of Sudan, to go to Khartoum and aid in the evacuation of Egyptian soldiers, civilian employees and their families.  Travelling from London, General Gordon reached Khartoum on 18 February 1884. He immediately began sending women, children and wounded soldiers back to Egypt as the military situation deteriorated in the Sudan and the south of the country was in danger of being cut off from Egypt by the Islamic Mahdist army.  Britain withdrew its troops from the Sudan until Khartoum was the last outpost remaining under British control.

Gordon differed with the British government's decision to abandon the Sudan.  He thought that the Islamic revolt had to be crushed for fear that it might eventually overwhelm Egypt. He based this on the Mahdi's claim of dominion over all Islamic lands. Defying orders from the British government to withdraw, General Gordon, leading a garrison of 6,000 men, began the defence of Khartoum.  On March 18, 1884, the Mahdist army laid siege to the city. The rebels stopped river traffic and cut the telegraph line to Cairo. Khartoum was cut off from resupply, which led to food shortages, but could still communicate with the outside world by using messengers. Under pressure from the public, in August 1884, the British government decided to reverse its policy and send a relief force to Khartoum.

Organising the Relief Force
The Expedition was put under the command of General Garnet Wolseley, who had seen service in the Crimean War, Canada, the Gold Coast and the South African Wars. The Expedition was composed of two officers and 43 soldiers from each British Light Cavalry Regiment.

Wolseley decided that the best way of reaching Khartoum would be to ascend the Nile River.  Based on his favourable experience with them during his expedition along the Red River to Fort Garry (now Winnipeg) in 1869–1870 to suppress the Red River Rebellion, Wolseley asked the Governor General of Canada, the Marquess of Lansdowne, if it would be possible to recruit a contingent of Canadian voyageurs to help him navigate the Nile.  He requested that they be commanded by Lieutenant-Colonel Frederick C. Denison, who had served as Wolseley's aide-de-camp during the Red River expedition.  The Prime Minister of Canada, John A. Macdonald, did not object once he was assured that the voyageurs were volunteers and would be paid by the British. Denison complied and on 15 September 1884, only 24 days after the request was received, 386 voyageurs set sail for Egypt.

The Canadians were known at the time as the Nile Voyageurs. As the traditional role of the voyageur was waning, most were formerly employed helping transport log booms down rivers such as the Ottawa, Gatineau and Saguenay. Eighty-six of the voyageurs were members of the First Nations, mostly Caughnawaga, an offshoot from the Mohawk and Ojibwa.

The Expedition
On 7 October 1884, the Canadians reached Alexandria and headed south by a combination of shallow draft steam launch and train. On 26 October 1884, the Canadians met Wolseley and his force of 5,400 soldiers at Wadi Halfa. By November they were at the first of six cataracts and began their work of ascending the rapids. The southern progress of the expedition sped up with the experienced voyageurs manning the boats. The boats that Wolseley selected were modified Royal Navy whalers. The boats had the capacity for a dozen men along with enough cargo to supply them for a hundred days.

In mid-November, the expedition received word from General Gordon that he could only survive the siege for another forty days.  The expedition was attacked by rebels at Abu Klea and Abu Cru, but was able to repel the rebels both times.  Progress up the river was slow and often the boats had to be pulled through rapids by rope from shore.  At several places the strength of the current necessitated several crews pulling one boat. They settled on a method of stationing the voyageurs at difficult stretches along the river, so that each group would become familiar with a particular stretch of water.

Realising that time was running out for General Gordon in Khartoum, Wolseley split his force into two columns.  He sent 2,400 men by camel on a 280 km shortcut across the desert to avoid the Great Bend of the Nile and reach the city sooner. The remaining 3,000 soldiers continued up the river.

The Canadians’ six-month contracts were soon to expire and they were asked to re-enlist.  Though offered generous inducements, only 86 of the voyageurs, including their commander, Denison, signed up for a second six-month contract.  The rest elected to return to Canada, hoping to arrive in time for the spring logging season.  This did not halt the expedition, as the worst of the river was already behind them and the smaller number of soldiers travelling by river reduced the need for the Canadians. Denison and his men continued piloting the small boats up the river.

General Gordon's last entry in his journal, dated 14 December 1884, read, “Now mark this, if the Expeditionary Force, and I ask for no more than 200 men, does not come in ten days, the town may fall; and I have done my best for the honour of our country. Good bye.” 

On 26 January 1885, Khartoum fell to the Mahdist army of 50,000 men. At that time of year the Nile was shallow enough to cross by wading and the Mahdists were able to breach the city's defences by attacking the poorly-defended approaches from the river. The entire garrison was slaughtered, including General Gordon. His head was cut off and delivered to the Mahdi.

Two days later, two British armed steamers, towing several native boats, the flotilla carrying some 140 British and native troops, came within sight of the city.  Dismayed at the sight of the city's fall, Brigadier-General Charles William Wilson, the on-scene commander, ordered his flotilla to turn about and steam back down river to Wolseley.  It was the closest the relief column would get to Khartoum.

After the Fall of Khartoum
Emboldened by their victory at the Battle of Khartoum, the Mahdists resisted British efforts to force the Nile.  This included, on 10 February 1885, the Mahdists defending a fortified site at Kirbekan they hoped would impede the main British column still ascending the river.  These military operations were occurring some two weeks after the fall of Khartoum and Brigadier Wilson's earlier glimpse of the fallen city from his steamship. At Kirbekan, whilst the British successfully seized the position, the British commander General William Earle was killed near the end of the attack.

The fall of Khartoum and the massacre of all within led to various communiques between Wolseley and London. Indicative of the confusion, on 7 February 1885, three days before the battle of Kirbekan, Wolseley was told by London to make no retrograde steps down the Nile to Egypt. Wolseley himself, however, was concerned that with the fall of Khartoum, he lacked sufficient military force to subdue the Mahdi.  This led to consideration of an operational pause, to last several months over the Sudan summer, which might allow fresh British reinforcements to be assembled in Egypt and later sent up the river to Wolseley.

The Panjdeh incident of 29 March 1885, initiated by Imperial Russia in south-central Asia, gave the British government sufficient excuse to make a face-saving withdrawal of the Wolseley force to Egypt and then home, thereby ending any further commitment to the region, including on the coast at Suakin. With the fall of Khartoum and now the subsequent removal of the last British troops in the vicinity of the upper Nile, Muhammad Ahmad controlled the whole of Sudan, allowing him to establish an Islamic state governed by Sharia law. He died less than six months later. His state survived him, but Sudan was re-conquered by the British in a campaign from 1895 to 1898, led by Lord Kitchener.

Legacy
On 17 April 1885, the Canadian contingent set sail from Alexandria for home. Sixteen Canadians had died on the expedition. They are memorialised in Canada's Peace Tower, which recognises all of Canada's war dead. Wolseley wrote a letter to the Canadian Governor General praising the Canadians' service and the British Parliament passed a motion thanking them for their efforts.

A collection of records from the expedition was compiled and edited by C.P. Stacey, and published by the Champlain Society in 1959.

A memorial plaque "Nile Voyageurs 1884–85" was erected at Kitchissippi Lookout on Island Park Drive just west of the Champlain Bridge in 1966.

In popular culture
Lance Corporal Jones in the T.V. sitcom Dad's Army claimed to have been involved in the Anglo-Egyptian invasion of Sudan in 1896–1899 and the Nile Expedition.

See also
 Khartoum, 1966 film
 The Four Feathers, 1939 film
 The Four Feathers, 2002 film

References

Notes

Sources

C.P. Stacey (1959). Records of the Nile Voyageurs, 1884-1885: The Canadian Voyageur Contingent in the Gordon Relief Expedition. Toronto: Champlain Society Publications.

Further reading
Colonel Mike Snook, Beyond the Reach of Empire: Wolseley's Failed Campaign to Save Gordon and Khartoum (Frontline, 2011)
Julian Symons, England's Pride: The Story of the Gordon Relief Expedition (Hamish Hamilton, 1965).

External links
 Boileau, John, Voyageurs on the Nile , Legion Magazine, January/February 2004.  Accessed: 4 April 2007
 MacLaren, Roy Nile Expedition, Canadian Encyclopedia  Accessed: 4 April 2007
 McGinnis Schulze, Lorine  Nile Expedition, Canadian Military History Project Accessed: 4 April 2007
 The Nile Expedition, 1884–85, Canadian Military Heritage   Accessed: 4 April 2007
 The National Maritime Museum, UK Accessed: 4 April 2007 
 Various Records of the Nile Expedition compiled and edited by C.P. Stacey, Published by the Champlain Society, 1959.

1884 in Sudan
Conflicts in 1884
1885 in Sudan
Conflicts in 1885
Battles involving Sudan
Battles of the Mahdist War
Sieges involving the United Kingdom
Battles involving Canada
History of Khartoum
Military expeditions
Expeditions from the United Kingdom